The Boat is a 1949 novel by British writer L.P. Hartley. An English writer returns home from Venice, and takes residence in a house by a river where he can indulge his passion in rowing.

References

Bibliography
  Wright, Adrian. Foreign Country: The Life of L.P. Hartley. I. B. Tauris, 2001.

1949 British novels
Novels by L. P. Hartley
Novels set in England
G. P. Putnam's Sons books